Rohan Sanjaya (born 13 June 2001) is a Sri Lankan cricketer. He made his first-class debut for Colts Cricket Club in the 2018–19 Premier League Tournament on 14 December 2018. He made his List A debut on 17 December 2019, for Colts Cricket Club in the 2019–20 Invitation Limited Over Tournament. He made his Twenty20 debut on 4 March 2021, for Colts Cricket Club in the 2020–21 SLC Twenty20 Tournament.

References

External links
 

2001 births
Living people
Sri Lankan cricketers
Colts Cricket Club cricketers
Place of birth missing (living people)